David A. Crocker (born 4 October 1937), is Research Professor in the School of Public Policy, at the University of Maryland, he is also the founder and former president of the International Development Ethics Association (IDEA). His work has been cited by the United Nations Human Development Report.

Education 
David Crocker gained his bachelor's degree in psychology from DePauw University, Greencastle, Indiana, in 1959. He also has three degrees from Yale University (M.Div in Philosophy of Religion 1963, MA in Philosophical Theology and Philosophy of Religion 1965, and a Ph.D in Philosophical Theology and Philosophy of Religion 1970).

Academic career 
 Taught philosophy for 25 years at Colorado State University
 UNESCO Chair in Development at the University of Valencia.
 Fellow of the Human Development and Capability Association.

Media 
Crocker was one of a number of leading philosophers who, at the 1998 World Congress of Philosophy, were interviewed by Michael Malone for the television series, A parliament of minds: philosophy for a new millennium.

Bibliography

Films

Books

Chapters in books

Journal articles

Further reading

References

External links 
 Profile: David Crocker  School of Public Policy, University of Maryland
 Profile: David Crocker Ethics of Employment
 David Crocker IMDB profile

1937 births
American political philosophers
DePauw University alumni
Feminist philosophers
Living people
University of Maryland, College Park faculty
Academic staff of the University of Valencia
Yale Divinity School alumni